"Trouble" is a song by American indie rock band American Authors. The song was written by band members Zachary Barnett, David Rublin, Matthew Sanchez and James Shelley with producers Aaron Accetta and Shep Goodman and originally recorded for the band's debut studio album Oh, What a Life, appearing as the fifth track on the album. The track was released by Mercury Records and Island Records as a promotional single on February 18, 2014.

Composition
"Trouble" has been described as a folk rock song, borrowing musical elements from Mumford & Sons, The Lumineers and Edward Sharpe and the Magnetic Zeros. Driven by the banjo as the lead instrument in the song, the track makes use of the voices of all four band members to create a crowd-like cheer that is used in the song's chorus and latter verses, an effect similar to the one used in "Best Day of My Life".

Reception
While most critics compared the song to "Best Day of My Life", the song was well received nevertheless by critics. Justin Stanford of music website Indie Trendsetters wrote that "It isn’t massive like "Best Day of My Life" but it is nice and low key, a little more intimate and personal. No doubt it is a buildup to something huge in their new album". Anna Murphy of music website Earmilk also wrote positively of the song, stating "this song will be a hit. Enjoy it in its first fresh week before it's making the rounds on syndicated airwaves & your little sister's surround sound".

The line "I knew she was trouble from the first kiss" indirectly refers to Taylor Swift's 2012 smash hit "I Knew You Were Trouble".

Track listing

Personnel
Adapted from Oh, What a Life liner notes.

American Authors
Zac Barnett – lead vocals, guitar
James Adam Shelley – lead guitar, banjo
Dave Rublin – bass
Matt Sanchez – drums

Technical personnel
Aaron Accetta – production
Michael Goodman – production

Charts

Release history

References

2014 songs
2014 singles
Island Records singles
Mercury Records singles
American Authors songs
Songs written by Shep Goodman
Songs written by Aaron Accetta
Song recordings produced by Aaron Accetta